Thammawut Rungruang is a Thai professional footballer. He currently plays for Thai League 3 side Udon Thani.
He previously played for TTM Phichit in Thai Premier League.

References

External links
BCC Tero website
Kon Division 2
Thai SoccerNet
Player Profile on SMM Online
Player Profile on Thai Premier League
Transfers 2011

Living people
Thammawut Rungruang
Thammawut Rungruang
Association football midfielders
Thammawut Rungruang
1987 births